Jan-Olof Nolsjö (born 27 July 1948) is a Swedish weightlifter. He competed in the men's super heavyweight event at the 1976 Summer Olympics.

References

External links
 

1948 births
Living people
Swedish male weightlifters
Olympic weightlifters of Sweden
Weightlifters at the 1976 Summer Olympics
People from Sollefteå Municipality
Sportspeople from Västernorrland County
20th-century Swedish people